Mark Montfort (born 30 January 1985) is a Guyanese-Canadian cricketer. He made his Twenty20 International (T20I) debut for Canada against the United States in the Regional Finals of the 2018–19 ICC T20 World Cup Americas Qualifier tournament on 25 August 2019. Prior to his T20I debut, he was selected to play for the Toronto Nationals franchise team in the 2019 Global T20 Canada tournament.

References

External links
 

1985 births
Living people
Canadian cricketers
Canada Twenty20 International cricketers
Place of birth missing (living people)
Guyanese emigrants to Canada